Joseph Bennett (1829 – 1 January 1908) was an English merchant and  Liberal politician.

Bennett was born at Grimsby, the son of  William Bennett and his wife Ann. He was educated at Wesley College, Sheffield and became a merchant at Louth. He was a J.P. for Lindsey Division of Lincolnshire, and for the Boroughs of Louth and Grimsby

In the 1885 general election,  Bennett was elected Member of Parliament for Gainsborough but lost the seat in the 1886 general election. He regained the seat in the 1892 general election but stood down from the House of Commons at the 1895 general election.

Bennett lived at Louth and died at the age of 78.

References

External links 

1829 births
1908 deaths
Liberal Party (UK) MPs for English constituencies
UK MPs 1885–1886
UK MPs 1892–1895
People from Grimsby
People educated at Wesley College, Sheffield